"Avengers Assemble" is an American comic book crossover storyline written by Jason Aaron with art by Bryan Hitch, Aaron Kuder, and Javier Garron, published in 2022 by Marvel Comics. The story, which serving as the final story of Jason Aaron's Avengers that ties into his Avengers Forever series, involves the Avengers teaming up their Prehistoric selves and alternate versions of themselves to fight against Mephisto's army and a multiversal version of Masters of Evil who plan to wreak havoc on the multiverse. The event overall received mixed reviews, with critics criticizing the inconsistent art, the writing, and the story.

Publication History 
In September 2022, Marvel Comics announced that Jason Aaron will create an event that called Avengers Assemble where the present Avengers will team up with the Avengers of 1,000,000 BC and alternate versions of themselves to fight off against Mephisto and his army.

Plot Summary

Prelude 
During the Damnation storyline, Mephisto is defeated by Doctor Strange at Hotel Inferno. Mephisto revives Phil Coulson and gives him the Pandemonium Cube to rewrite history. Phil Coulson created an alternate timeline where Squadron Supreme were the superheroes and Avengers never existed. Phil Coulson was defeated, but this allowed Mephisto to demonstrate to his alternate versions how effective they would be if they teamed up to change reality.

Mephisto teams up with two other versions of himself to create a multiversal version of Masters of Evil to wipe out multiple versions of the Avengers. Mephisto plans to go to the Genesis Point of Earth 616 History to wipe out the Avengers, and the Avengers travel back in time to pursue Mephisto. Mephisto's other target is the Avengers of the 1,000,000 B.C. (a younger Odin, ancient versions of Black Panther, Iron Fist, Ghost Rider, Phoenix Force, Agamotto (the first Sorcerer Supreme), and Starbrand (a regular human being name Vinn who resembles Red Hulk). Meanwhile, a mysterious character name Avengers Prime sends out Deathloks to protect the timeline from Mephisto. Robbie Reyes goes out to meet alternate versions of Avengers to convince them to fight Mephisto. Robbie Reyes turns into the All-Rider (a Ghost Rider who can turn anything into a vehicle) and nearly loses his life fighting against an alternate version of Doctor Doom (leader of the multiversal Masters of Evil) but is saved by Deathlok, who tells Robbie that he will be a key player to stopping Mephisto.

Main Plot 
The Modern Avengers (Steve Rogers, Iron Man, Captain Marvel, Nighthawk, Thor, Jane Foster, Namor and Echo)  meet the Prehistoric Avengers by travelling to the past, however after Agamotto is suddenly attacked by fire, the Prehistoric Avengers mistakenly believe that Echo (who is the host of the Phoenix Force) is attacking Agamotto, and they fight. After Thor and Odin hit each other with Mjolnir which caused majority of heroes to be knocked out, Doom Supreme (an alternate version of Doctor Doom) arrives to kills Starbrand and takes Agamotto's eyes. Doctor Supreme sends out his Multiversal Masters of Evil (King Killmonger (Killmonger who has Destroyer armor), Ghost Goblin (a combination of Green Goblin and Ghost Rider), The Black Skull (Red Skull who has the Venom symbiote), Young Thanos, Dark Phoenix (evil version of Phoenix Force who is actually Mystique) and her pet Berserker (an evil version of Wolverine). Meanwhile, Avengers Prime is wounded by an army of Mephistos, and Robbie Reyes arrives with an alternate version of Scott Lang on The God Quarry (a boundary between realities) where he realizes he cant activate his powers.  

Dark Phoenix tries destroying the modern and past Avengers, but it fails and the Avengers attack the Multiversal Masters of Evil. Prehistoric Ghost Rider kills Ghost Goblin, and Dark Phoenix and Doom Supreme combine their powers to try to destroy the universe, but Jane Foster and Prehistoric Ghost Rider try to burn off Doom Supreme's magic, with Prehistoric Ghost Rider sacrificing himself. Meanwhile, the Phoenix Force hears the battle that is going on, and goes to Earth. 

After meeting with the alternate versions of the Avengers on the God Quarry, Robbie Reyes is attacked by an army of different Mephistos. The alternate versions of Avengers manage to deal heavy damage to the army of Mephisto, while Tony Stark (who is Ant-Man in his universe) asks where Avengers Prime is. An alternate version of Vision and Moon Knight (name Mariama Spector) tells Stark that Avenger Prime may have been captured. They then shrink down and go to tunnels underneath the battlefield where they find out that Mephisto plans to gain access to universal energy on God Quarry, which will destroy the Multiverse. Just when Stark is about to be killed, Old Man Phoenix (an elderly Wolverine with the Phoenix Force) arrives with King thor's daughters to save them. 

Prehistoric Iron Fist takes down King Killmonger, while Iron Man confronts an alternate version of Howard Stark. The alternate Howard Stark asks Iron Man to join him, but when Iron Man refuses, Howard stark uses an EMP to neutralize his armor and attack him, but Iron Man defeats his alternate father. The Black Skull deals heavy damage to Captain America, Nighthawk, and Agamotto, but is pushed back by the combined efforts of Thor, Odin, Namor, and Captain Marvel. Young Thanos uses the Venom symbiote from Black Skull to push the rest of the Avengers back. Jane Foster and Echo try fighting off Dark Phoenix, who is revealed to be an evil version of Mystique. Dark Phoenix escapes and meets with Doom Supreme who reveals that he is assembling an army of Doctor Dooms on a planet. 

Old Man Phoenix recalls that he fought against Dark Phoenix in the White Hot room (Marvel's version of the Afterlife and base of operations for the Phoenix Force) where Dark Phoenix sent his body parts across every direction. King Thor's granddaughter meet Mangog and fought him in order to retrieve Old Man Phoenix's parts. In the present, Old Man Phoenix arrive to help Ant-Man and his allies repel the Mephisto army. Just then, the Doom planet arrives and Doom Supreme appears. Doom Supreme puts a magic barrier to protect himself, but Avengers Prime arrives after dealing with Mephisto, and reveals himself to be Loki. 

Avengers Prime recounts his backstory where in his universe, Thor died due to Mjolnir being sentient and flying Thor to the sun. Loki overthrew Odin as the All Father, but grew bored of his power. Avengers Prime traveled to different universes where he observed that the Avengers will defeat Loki everytime. To prevent that from happening, Avengers Prime prevented the Avengers in his timeline from happening, but as a result other cosmic beings like Galactus, Thanos, Gorr the God Butcher, Celestials and Red Skull converge on Earth. Avengers Prime manages to defeat everyone, but grows bored and throws himself to the sun, but is taken to the God Quarry. The God Quarry force Loki to create a headquarter where alternate versions of the Avengers will reside in. In the present, Loki manages to dispatch the rest of Doom Supreme and Mephisto's army, and creates a portal where the modern and pre-historic Avengers appear. 

Young Thanos mocks Mephisto on his failures,  and when Mephisto enters the God Quarry, the Council of Red is not happy with Mephisto's progress in defeating the Avengers.  Mephisto murders the entire Council of Red  and absorbs their power.  As the main Avengers help out their alternate counterparts, Old Man Phoenix and Echo try to take on Doom planet as Avengers Prime and Loki defeat Doom Supreme, but Mephisto appears as the final enemy.  During the chaos, Kazaar arrives with the Power Cosmic as well as Galactus and a Celestial.  Old Man Phoenix's granddaughters pick up their own Mjolnirs as they get ready to fight Doom Supreme and Mephisto. 

Mephisto easily decimates the Avengers, but a Celestial that has the ability of Deathlok shoots a bullet that wounds Mephisto. Avengers Prime and Loki try to take on Doom Supreme once more, Robbie Reyes and an aging Starbrand talk about their destiny before joining the fight, and the Phoenix Force arrives to help Thor defeat Dark Phoenix. Mephisto gains enough power to destroy the Doom Planet in order to free an ancient multiverse, and Avengers Prime realizes that Mephisto's goal was to never rewrite the Marvel Multiverse, but end it.

Reading Order 

 Avengers Assemble Alpha #1
 Avengers Vol. 8 #63
 Avengers Forever Vol. 2 #12
 Avengers Vol. 8 #64
 Avengers Forever Vol. 2 #13
 Avengers Vol. 8 #65 
 Avengers Forever Vol. 2 #14
 Avengers Vol. 8 #66
 Avengers Forever Vol. 2 #15
 Avengers Assemble Omega #1

Critical Reception 
The event overall received mixed to negative reviews. On Comicbookroundup, Avengers Assemble Alpha #1 received an Average score of 6.4 out of 10 based on 10 reviews.

On ComicbookRoundup, Avengers Issue 63 received an average score of 6 out of 10 based on 3 reviews.

On ComicbookRoundup, Avengers Forever Issue 12 received an average score of 6.6 out of 10 based on 4 reviews.

On ComicbookRoundup, Avengers Issue 64 received an average score of 6.3 out of 10 based on 5 review.

On ComicbookRoundup, Avengers Forever Issue 13 received an average score of 7.8 out of 10 based on 5 reviews. 

On ComicbookRoundup, Avengers Issue 65 received an average score of 6.6 out of 10 based on 4 reviews. 

On ComicbookRoundup, Avengers Forever Issue 14 received an average score of 6.6 out of 10 based on 6 reviews. 

On ComicbookRoundup, Avengers Issue 66 received an average score of 6.6 out of 10 based on 5 reviews. 

On ComicbookRoundup, Avengers Forever Issue 15 received an average rating of 5.8 out of 10 based on 4 reviews.

References 

Avengers (comics) storylines